The following is a partial list of the "E" codes for Medical Subject Headings (MeSH), as defined by the United States National Library of Medicine (NLM).

This list continues the information at List of MeSH codes (E02). Codes following these are found at List of MeSH codes (E04). For other MeSH codes, see List of MeSH codes.

The source for this content is the set of 2006 MeSH Trees from the NLM.

– anesthesia and analgesia

– analgesia
  – acupuncture analgesia
  – analgesia, epidural
  – analgesia, obstetrical
  – analgesia, patient-controlled
  – audioanalgesia
  – neuroleptanalgesia
  – transcutaneous electric nerve stimulation
  – electroacupuncture

– anesthesia
  – anesthesia, conduction
  – anesthesia, epidural
  – anesthesia, caudal
  – anesthesia, local
  – anesthesia, spinal
  – nerve block
  – autonomic nerve block
  – anesthesia, dental
  – hypnosis, dental
  – anesthesia, general
  – anesthesia, inhalation
  – anesthesia, closed-circuit
  – anesthesia, rectal
  – anesthesia, intratracheal
  – anesthesia, intravenous
  – anesthesia, obstetrical
  – cryoanesthesia
  – electroacupuncture
  – hypnosis, anesthetic
  – hypnosis, dental

– anesthesia recovery period

– conscious sedation

– electronarcosis

– hypotension, controlled

– neuromuscular blockade

– preanesthetic medication

The list continues at List of MeSH codes (E04).

E03